Nino Bixio was a protected cruiser built by the Italian Regia Marina (Royal Navy) in the early 1910s. Nino Bixio saw service during World War I and briefly engaged the Austro-Hungarian cruiser  in 1915. Her career was cut short in the post-war period due to severe cuts to the Italian naval budget, coupled with her unreliable engines. Nino Bixio was stricken from the naval register in March 1929 and sold for scrap.

Design

She had a short forecastle deck and a pair of pole masts. Her crew consisted 13 officers and 283 enlisted men.

The ship's propulsion system consisted of three Curtiss steam turbines, each driving a screw propeller. Steam was provided by fourteen mixed coal and oil firing Blechynden boilers, which were vented into four widely spaced funnels.

The ship was armed with a main battery of six  L/50 guns mounted singly. She was also equipped with a secondary battery of six  L/50 guns, which provided close-range defense against torpedo boats. She also carried two  torpedo tubes submerged in the hull. Nino Bixio also had a capacity to carry 200 naval mines.

Service history
Nino Bixio, named for the soldier and politician, was built at the  shipyard; her keel was laid down on 15 February 1911, the same day as her sister . Nino Bixios completed hull was launched ten months later on 30 December, after which fitting-out work commenced. The ship was completed by 5 May 1914, when she was commissioned into the Italian fleet. Nino Bixio was thereafter assigned to the 2nd Division of the 1st Squadron; the squadron consisted of two divisions of battleships, each supported by a scout cruiser. The 2nd Division included the four s, for which Nino Bixio served as the scout.

Italy, a member of the Central Powers, declared neutrality at the start of World War I in August 1914, but by May 1915, the Triple Entente had convinced the Italians to enter the war against their former allies. Admiral Paolo Thaon di Revel, the Italian naval chief of staff, believed that Austro-Hungarian submarines could operate too effectively in the narrow waters of the Adriatic, which could also be easily seeded with minefields. The threat from these underwater weapons was too serious for him to use the fleet in an active way. Instead, Revel decided to implement blockade at the relatively safer southern end of the Adriatic with the main fleet, while smaller vessels, such as the MAS boats, conducted raids on Austro-Hungarian ships and installations. Nino Bixio, Marsala, and the cruiser  were based at Brindisi during the war, where they could patrol the path from the narrow Adriatic to the Mediterranean.

In December 1915, an Austro-Hungarian force of two cruisers and five destroyers attempted to intercept transports supplying the Serbian Army trapped in Albania. The first flotilla engaged in a running battle with the fleeing Austro-Hungarian cruiser  but Nino Bixios group was too far behind to join the fray. By May 1917, the reconnaissance forces at Brindisi had come under the command of Rear Admiral Alfredo Acton. On the night of 14–15 May, the Austro-Hungarian cruisers Helgoland, and  raided the Otranto Barrage—a patrol line of drifters intended to block Austro-Hungarian and German U-boats. She did not participate in the ensuing Battle of the Otranto Straits because she did not have steam up in her boilers when the Italo-British forces counterattacked.

The Regia Marina demobilized after the end of the war in 1918 and the draw-down continued into the 1920s in large part due to severe budgetary shortfalls in the postwar period. The engines installed on Nino Bixio and her sister proved to be problematic throughout her time in service, which ultimately cut her career short. She was stricken from the naval register on 15 March 1929 and subsequently broken up for scrap; in contrast, the much more efficient Quarto, which had been built before Nino Bixio, remained in service for another decade.

Footnotes

Notes

Citations

References

Further reading

External links
 Nino Bixio Marina Militare website 

Nino Bixio-class cruisers
1911 ships
Ships built in Castellammare di Stabia